The 2006–07 Memphis Tigers men's basketball team represented the University of Memphis in the 2006–07 college basketball season, the 86th season of Tiger basketball. The Tigers were coached by seventh-year head coach John Calipari, and they played their home games at the FedExForum in Memphis, Tennessee.

Recruiting

Roster

Schedule

|-
!colspan=9| Regular Season

|-
!colspan=9| 2007 Conference USA tournament

|-
!colspan=9| 2007 NCAA tournament

References

Memphis Tigers men's basketball seasons
Memphis
Memphis
Memphis
Memphis